Batali Hill is the highest hill in the city of Chittagong, Bangladesh. It is located near the Tiger Pass crossing, about 1 kilometre from the center of the city, and falls under Khulshi Thana.

The hill is about 280 feet high. However, the hill faces threats of erosion and landslides due to illegal hill-cutting activities. In June, 2007, a massive landslide in the area surrounding Batali Hill killed at least 128 people.

There is also an eternal flame (Shikha Onirban) commemorating the Bangladesh Liberation War martyrs

References

Geography of Chittagong
Hills of Bangladesh